Bar Aftab-e Shirani (also Romanized as Bar Āftāb-e Shīrānī) is a village in Milas Rural District, in the Central District of Lordegan County, Chaharmahal and Bakhtiari Province, Iran. At the 2006 census, its population was 4,126, in 798 families.

References 

Populated places in Lordegan County